Nurul Huda Mosque of Gelgel is a historic mosque in Bali, Indonesia. It is considered the oldest mosque in Bali and one of the earliest in the Indonesian archipelago. The mosque is located in the village of Gelgel, Klungkung Regency.

Description
It is said that the mosque was first founded by the 40 Muslim soldiers of the Majapahit Empire, who accompanied the king of Gelgel, Dalem Ketut Klesir, after the Majapahit king Hayam Wuruk summoned the kings throughout the archipelago for a conference. The Muslim soldiers settled down with permission from the king, and the mosque was used as a place for worship and the center to spread Islam in Bali. This makes it the first mosque in the island of Bali. Another account tells that the mosque was founded by Muslim missionaries in the 16th century, who decided to settle down in Bali.

Since the foundation, the mosque became a center of the Muslim village with around 300 families. Today, not only Balinese Muslims but Muslim immigrants from the other islands reside in the village.

The mosque has been renovated numerous times and it has transformed into a big mosque. The mosque is equipped with a 17-meters minaret. Although there is no old building left, the mimbar retains its original shape.

References

Buildings and structures in Bali
16th-century mosques
Mosques in Indonesia